The Wilson Tobs are an amateur baseball team playing in the Coastal Plain League, an NCAA-sanctioned collegiate summer baseball league. The team plays its home games at Fleming Stadium in Wilson, North Carolina. Today's Tobs were one of the original teams in the collegiate Coastal Plain League when the league was founded in 1997; prior to 1997 the town of Wilson hosted minor league teams throughout the 20th century. In 2005 the Coastal Plain League named the Tobs the CPL Organization of the Year. The Tobs' mascot has been a tobacco worm named Slugger since the 1999 season.

External links
 Official Site
 Coastal Plain League

Coastal Plain League
Wilson, North Carolina
1997 establishments in North Carolina
Baseball teams established in 1997
Amateur baseball teams in North Carolina